Ali Asgar may refer to:

 Ali al-Asghar ibn Husayn ("Younger ‘Ali"), the youngest child of Al-Husayn, grandson of the Islamic Prophet Muhammad 
 Ali Asgar, Iran (disambiguation), villages in Iran
 Ali Asgar (actor), Indian actor